Bryan Spencer (born September 25, 1967) is an American politician. He was a member of the Missouri House of Representatives from 2013 to 2021. He is a member of the Republican Party.

Election results

References

Living people
Republican Party members of the Missouri House of Representatives
1967 births
21st-century American politicians
People from Rolla, Missouri
People from Wentzville, Missouri